William Bouch (1813–1876) was an English railway engineer, who is famous for the steam locomotives he designed for the Stockton and Darlington Railway. In 1860, Bouch designed the first British standard gauge locomotives to use a 4-4-0 wheel layout which had earlier become popular in the United States.

Career
William Bouch was apprenticed to Robert Stephenson and Company and later served in the Russian Navy. He became Locomotive Engineer of the Stockton and Darlington Railway in 1840.

Saltburn class locomotives

These 4-4-0 locomotives were designed by William Bouch for the Stockton and Darlington Railway. They were built by Robert Stephenson and introduced in 1862. Leading dimensions were: Driving wheels, 7 ft 0½in; grate area, 12¾ square feet; total heating surface, 1053 square feet; weight, 46 tons. 
 They passed to the North Eastern Railway in 1863.

Family
William was a brother of Sir Thomas Bouch.

Preserved locomotive
One of Bouch's locomotives survives - NER '1001' Class No. 1275.

See also
 Locomotives of the Stockton and Darlington Railway

References

English engineers
Locomotive builders and designers
B
English railway mechanical engineers
British railway pioneers
1813 births
1876 deaths
19th-century British businesspeople